Imajin is the only album by American band of  the same name. It was released on October 26, 1999 on Jive Records. It peaked at #44 on the Billboard Top Heatseekers Chart.

Track listing 

Outtakes

Always Been You (4:39)
Something About Love (4:21)
No Love (4:13)
Ain't Too Proud To Beg For Your Love (4:18)
Baby Girl (2:31) (Later sold the rights to R&B group B2K)
I Never Dreamed You'd Leave Me in Summer (3:25)
I Got What You Need (5:45)

References

1999 albums
Jive Records albums